Dipterocarpus applanatus is a species of tree in the family Dipterocarpaceae. It is endemic to Borneo.

References

applanatus
Endemic flora of Borneo
Trees of Borneo